Arley railway station is a station on the Severn Valley Railway heritage line in Worcestershire, situated just over the River Severn from the village of Upper Arley; a footbridge crosses the river to link the station to the village.

History
The station was built along with the line in 1862 and opened on 1 February that year. The first signal box was built in 1883, and the platform built to accommodate six coach trains. The main brick-built station building, which holds the booking office, is located on the easterly platform. The local transport needs were met quite adequately, as the local roads and paths were, to say the least, primitive. Passenger trade was busiest with summer holiday visitors, and Arley was home to a small goods yard.

Opened by the West Midland Railway (Severn Valley Line), and absorbed by the Great Western Railway on 1 August 1863, the station stayed with that company during the Grouping of 1923, passing on to the Western Region of British Railways during the nationalisation of 1948. It was later closed by the British Railways Board.

Although closed by the BRB on 9 September 1963 during the implementation of the Beeching Axe, plans for its closure had already been made before Beeching's report was published. The passing loop was taken out, sidings cut up and platforms removed, with only Alveley coal traffic surviving. In 1969 the line through Arley finally became disused.

Preservation

When the line was reopened by SVR preservationists working up from Bridgnorth in 1974, work got underway to restore Arley to its former glory. The main railway building was in relatively good condition and was totally renovated. The platforms were rebuilt and the track re-laid. A fully signalled passing loop enables full length north and southbound trains to stop and pass each other within the station limits.

The old signal box having been demolished, a replacement of LNWR design was bought from BR and brought in from Yorton, near Whitchurch, Shropshire, with the lever frame from the Kidderminster station Signalbox that was originally sited on Kidderminster (mainline) station. The station was re-opened on 18 May 1974.

Arley station has been used as a filming location for several films and TV programmes, such as Disney's Candleshoe, BBC sitcom Oh, Doctor Beeching!, The Box of Delights and the ChuckleVision episode "Oh Brother". The station was also used for the filming of the opening scene of the 2020 film Enola Holmes.

Gallery

References

Notes

Sources
 
 
 
 
 Station on navigable O.S. map

Further reading
 

Heritage railway stations in Worcestershire
Railway stations in Great Britain opened in 1862
Former Great Western Railway stations
Severn Valley Railway
Railway stations in Great Britain closed in 1963
Railway stations in Great Britain opened in 1974
1862 establishments in England